Amian-Kouassikro is a village in eastern Ivory Coast. It is in the sub-prefecture of Aniassué, Abengourou Department, Indénié-Djuablin Region, Comoé District. The village sits on the east bank of the Comoé River, which forms the boundary between the Comoé and Lagunes Districts.

Amian-Kouassikro was a commune until March 2012, when it became one of 1126 communes nationwide that were abolished.

Notes

Former communes of Ivory Coast
Populated places in Comoé District
Populated places in Indénié-Djuablin